Pioneer Secondary School (abbreviation: PSS) was a government co-educational secondary school in Jurong West, Singapore.

It existed from 1994 to 2016.

Due to falling enrollment, the school has merged into Boon Lay Secondary School.

History 
The school was officially opened in December 1994. While waiting for its school building to be ready, it was temporarily housed at Hong Kah Secondary School under the same principal, Mrs Yeo Chin Nam. Mrs Tan Sor Poh was appointed the principal, followed by Mr Tan Chor Pang. Mr Satianathan S/O K Ndarajah, the previous principal, took over the school in December 2005. Now, the position has been taken over by Mr Mark Chan as of 15 December 2011.

In March 2016, it was announced that due to falling student cohort sizes the school would be merged with Boon Lay Secondary School. The merge is expected to be done in January 2017 with the new school located at Boon Lay Secondary School.

Notable alumni
 Ronny Chieng: comedian, actor and radio presenter based in New York City
 Desmond Tan: actor, Mediacorp

References

External links
 School website

Secondary schools in Singapore
Jurong West
Educational institutions established in 1994
1994 establishments in Singapore